The Indiana University Jacobs School of Music in Bloomington, Indiana, is a music conservatory established in 1921. Until 2005, it was known as the Indiana University School of Music. It has more than 1,500 students, approximately half of whom are undergraduates, with the second largest enrollment of all music schools accredited by the National Association of Schools of Music.

History
In 1907, Charles Campbell arranged for a recital of the Schellschmidt Quartet of Indianapolis, the proceeds of which established a music fund, "to lead ultimately to the equipment of a school of music in the university." In 1909, he offered a series of noncredit lectures on the history of music, which eventually led to a full-fledged music department. In 1919 Barzille Winfred Merrill took the position of department head and worked to create a separate school of music. He campaigned for a new music building as well, which was dedicated in 1937, and renamed Merril Hall in 1989. In 1921 the Department of Music officially became the School of Music. Merrill's daughter, violinist Winifred Merrill Warren, was an artist-in-residence at the school from 1927 to 1938, and on the school's faculty from 1938 to 1961.

In 1938 Robert L. Sanders was appointed Dean and remains the school's youngest-ever dean. Through his efforts, the school gained membership in the National Association of Schools of Music and built the Hall of Music (now known as the Indiana University Auditorium). In 1941 the Indiana University Auditorium was dedicated and offered 15 events including appearances by the Ballet Russe de Monte-Carlo and the San Carlo Opera Company.

In 1942 the school staged its first full opera: Cavalleria rusticana. That year the Metropolitan Opera Company visited IU for the first time, performing Aida, and would return again for the next 15 years, presenting two operas each visit.

In 1982 Leonard Bernstein spent six weeks at the school to work on his final opera, A Quiet Place. In 1980, the School of Music launched a weekly radio chamber music series produced by WFIU. In its first year, the series featured student and faculty performers and was broadcast on six Indiana stations. By 1981 (and through 1984), "Music from Indiana" had achieved national syndication on American Public Radio, and in 1983, the number of stations carrying the program had jumped to 54.

In 2005 the school announced it had received a gift of $40.6 million from Barbara and David H. Jacobs for the school of music. 

In 2009, the school received a gift from the family of Leonard Bernstein that included the entire contents of Bernstein's conducting studio.

Academics and programs

Admissions
Admission to the Jacobs School of Music is done by a live or recorded audition only. The overall acceptance rate is generally about 25 percent for undergraduate students and about 30 percent for graduate students. However, acceptance rates vary greatly between programs. Each freshman class contains about 200 new students.

Ensembles
Students in most degree programs at the school are required to participate in an ensemble during every semester spent at the school. Depending on the student's degree program, he or she may be required to participate in specific ensembles. The majority of ensembles are auditioned.

Owing to the large size of the school, there are thirteen choirs, three bands and seven orchestras at the school. They encompass a broad range size and musical styles and include the Singing Hoosiers, Opera Chorus, Wind Ensemble, Baroque Orchestra, Concentus, Chamber Orchestra, Philharmonic Orchestra, as well as various jazz ensembles.

Outside of organized ensembles, performance majors are required to participate in chamber music. These ensembles are usually student-formed and coached by a faculty member. Student conductors and those wishing to solo with orchestra can also form ad-hoc orchestras. These are completely student-run. Drummer, composer, educator Sean Dobbins serves on the jazz faculty at Jacobs.

Contemporary
The school is home to two of the nation's premier contemporary music ensembles:
New Music Ensemble, founded by former Prof. Frederick A. Fox in 1975, and currently directed by Prof. David Dzubay: Composed of the top musicians from the school of music, this group contains; 1 flute, 1 oboe, 1 clarinet, 1 bassoon, 1 saxophone, 1 horn, 1 trumpet, 1 trombone, 1 tuba, 2 pianists, 1 harp, 2-3 percussionists, 2 violins, 1 viola, 1 cello and 1 bass
NOTUS, formerly known as the Contemporary Vocal Ensemble, a 24-voice choir that specializes in contemporary choral repertoire and especially the works of living composers. Directed by Dominick DiOrio, the ensemble frequently premieres works by students, faculty, and emerging professional composers and frequently tours nationally.

Opera
The Jacobs School of Music has long been known for their operatic history. The school currently produces five operas and one musical each year, three for each semester. The Opera Theater stages works in varying styles and size. They frequently perform classic works by composers such as Mozart, Verdi, Puccini, and Donizetti, but they also perform Baroque operas by Handel, and contemporary works. Cast and chorus members are students, and many of the crew are students as well.

Programs of study
The school offers Bachelor of Music (B.M.) degrees, Master of Arts (M.A.) degrees, Master of Music (M.M.) degrees, Doctor of Philosophy (Ph.D.) degrees, and Doctor of Music (D.M.) degrees, among others, in a large and diverse number of musical fields. The school also awards a "Performer's Certificate" or "Artist's Diploma" to students who demonstrate exceptionally outstanding performance ability. The school also offers degrees in Historical Performance. Additionally, it is possible for students to enroll in a unique degree program available at Indiana University known as the B.S.O.F. or Bachelor of Science in an Outside Field in some select areas of study so that students may diversify their education outside of the standard prescribed curriculum.

Awards and honors for the Jacobs School of Music
Honors for the school include being ranked first in the nation by Change magazine, The Chronicle of Higher Education, and U.S. News & World Report. The IU School of Music as a whole was recently listed first among the "Top Ten Voice Schools in America" by Classical Singer. IU School of Music voice students are frequent winners in the Metropolitan Opera National Council Auditions in New York City each spring. The school has had five grand winners in the last five years and 33 grand winners overall. An unparalleled twenty students and alumni have received BMI Student Composer Awards. In April 1981, the opera program became the first non-professional company to stage an opera at the Metropolitan Opera in New York City,

Faculty
The school has more than 175 full-time faculty members that include performers, scholars, and teachers of international renown. In addition, many top musicians and scholars come to the school each year to give master classes and guest lectures or to serve as visiting artistic directors, conductors, and faculty.

A list of current faculty members may be found on the school's website.

Facilities
The school's facilities, including five buildings located in the heart of the IU Bloomington campus, comprise recital halls, more than 170 practice rooms, choral and instrumental rehearsal rooms, and more than 100 offices and studios.

Musical Arts Center
The Musical Arts Center, known as the MAC, is the school's largest performance facility. Designed by Indianapolis architect Evans Woollen III and completed in 1972, it is an example of the Brutalist architecture style. The facility is equipped with a cylindrical-shapted opera theater with European-style seating for 1,460 and space for a 100-piece orchestra, as well as studios, classrooms, and rehearsal facilities for music and ballet. The backstage area occupies more than half of the building. The 90×60 foot stage is often compared to that of the Metropolitan Opera House in New York, while the unsegmented seating design in the orchestral seats is based on the seating arrangement of the Bayreuth Festspielhaus. Currently, the MAC hosts performances of six operas and three ballets annually, as well as orchestra concerts.

Peau Rouge Indiana, a large sculpture by Alexander Calder, sits on the lawn in front of the MAC. It was renovated over the course of two months during the Fall 2007 semester.

Simon Music Center
The Simon Music Center (pictured at the top of the page) opened after an extensive renovation in 1995 and houses the William and Gayle Cook Music Library, Auer Hall, Ford-Crawford Hall, Sweeney Lecture Hall, the Latin American Music Center, classrooms, and administrative and faculty offices.

Auer Hall
Located on the second floor of the Simon Music Center, Auer Hall was possible by a $1 million dollar gift from Ione B. Auer, the 400-seat auditorium has a high-beamed, coffered ceiling, with two side terraces. It is home to the Maidee H. and Jackson A. Seward Organ, also known as C. B. Fisk, Op. 135. The instrument, boasting nearly 4,000 pipes, was realized through a gift from the Sewards.

Notable alumni

Notes

References

External links

Music schools in Indiana
United States National Medal of Arts recipients
Indiana University Bloomington
1921 establishments in Indiana
Education in Monroe County, Indiana
Buildings and structures in Bloomington, Indiana
Tourist attractions in Bloomington, Indiana